Daniel Peterson may refer to:

 Daniel Peterson (physician), American physician known for the treatment of chronic fatigue syndrome
 Daniel C. Peterson, professor of Islamic Studies and Arabic at Brigham Young University
 Dan Peterson (born 1936), former American professional basketball head coach
 Dan Peterson (politician), Canadian politician

See also
 Daniel Petersen (disambiguation)
 Daniel Pettersson